Harlem Heights is a BET reality show. It documented the lives of eight trendy African-American 20-somethings as they navigated through relationships and their professional lives. The series aired Mondays only on BET. Along with fellow reality series College Hill and Baldwin Hills, Harlem Heights was discontinued as BET shifted to scripted programs like The Game.

Cast
The following is a list of cast members.

  Main Cast Member
  Secondary Cast Member

Episodes

Season 1
Season 1 of Harlem Heights consisted of 10 episodes which began on March 2, 2009 and concluded on April 20, 2009.

References

External links 
 BET Shows - Harlem Heights

2000s American reality television series
2009 American television series debuts
2009 American television series endings
BET original programming
English-language television shows
Television shows set in New York City